Peter Gerald Stewart Murray  Hon. FRIBA (born 6 April 1944) is a British writer and commentator on architecture and the built environment. He is currently Chairman of New London Architecture and the London Society, in addition to being Master of the Worshipful Company of Chartered Architects. He is a keen cyclist and campaigner for cycling issues.

Education
Murray studied at the RWA School of Architecture and the Architectural Association School of Architecture, London, in the 1960s.

Career
Murray was editor of Building Design and then the RIBA Journal. In 1983, he launched Blueprint magazine with Deyan Sudjic; this was followed by Eye, the international review of graphic design and Tate magazine for the Tate Gallery. He has worked on major projects around the world including Broadgate in the UK, Taipei 101, Taiwan, Union Square in Hong Kong, Avant Seine in Paris and Hudson Yards and One World Trade Center in New York City. In 2004, Murray launched the first London Architecture Biennale (now the London Festival of Architecture) in Clerkenwell.

He is chairman of New London Architecture: the centre for London's built environment and President of Wordsearch, a consultancy explaining and promoting architecture, planning and the built environment.

A prolific author, his works include The Saga of Sydney Opera House, "A passion to build" and "Architecture and Commerce."

Murray was made a fellow of the Royal Society of Arts in 1989 and an Honorary Fellow of the Royal Institute of British Architects in 1999. He is a member of the Academy of Urbanism, a board member of the Center for Active Design and of the Association of Architectural Organisations.

Murray was appointed Officer of the Order of the British Empire (OBE) in the 2021 Birthday Honours for services to leadership in the arts, architecture, city planning, design and publication and to charity.

Appointments
He is Chairman of the London Society, Deputy Chairman of the Bedford Park Society, a member of the Construction Industry Cycling Commission and of the Mayor's Design Advisory Group. He is on the board of developer Be First, an urban regeneration company wholly owned by Barking and Dagenham Council.

Charity work
In 2005, Murray started the Cycle to Cannes charity bike ride. In 2013, he took part in a 6000 km cycle ride for charity from Portland, Oregon to Portland Place, London researching the implementation of cycling strategies in US cities.

References

External links
 http://www.newlondonarchitecture.org

1944 births
British male journalists
Living people
Fellows of the Royal Institute of British Architects
Alumni of the Architectural Association School of Architecture
Officers of the Order of the British Empire